Sphenomorphus simus, the common forest skink, is a species of skink found in Indonesia and Papua New Guinea.

References

simus
Reptiles described in 1879
Taxa named by Henri Émile Sauvage
Skinks of New Guinea